RFA Spabrook (A224) was a coastal water carrier of the Royal Fleet Auxiliary. Arrived at Briton Ferry for scrapping, 13 September 1977.

References

1944 ships
Spa-class coastal water carriers